Viruppakka  is a village in Thrissur district in the state of Kerala, India. There is co-operate spinning Mill at Viruppakka. Perapara Check-dam also is a part of Viruppakka. Religious places in Viruppakka - Vasudeva Puram Temple, 2 Mosques and St. George Malankara Catholic Church.Current Thekkumkara Panchayath President Mr. Sunil Jacob is from Viruppakka.
 
Mr.Sreekrishnan R is from Viruppakka.

References

Villages in Thrissur district